Tuckerman Brewing Company is a brewery in Conway, New Hampshire, USA. Named after the nearby Tuckerman Ravine, the brewery currently produces three year round beers, the self-named pale ale, an Altbier, and the 6288 Stout.

References

Further reading
 Beer and bananas: Tuckerman Brewing teams up with Nature Conservancy in Pine Barrens moth study
 This time around, N.H.'s craft beer industry shows signs of staying power - New Hampshire Business Review - July 29 2011

External links
 Tuckerman Brewing Company

Beer brewing companies based in New Hampshire
Companies based in Carroll County, New Hampshire
Conway, New Hampshire